Patricia Rozema (born 20 August 1958) is a Canadian film director, writer and producer. She was part of a loosely-affiliated group of filmmakers to emerge in 1980s from Toronto known as the Toronto New Wave.

Early life 
Rozema was born in Kingston, Ontario and raised in Sarnia, Ontario. Her parents, Jacoba Berandina (née Vos) and Jan Rozema, were Dutch Calvinists. Television was severely restricted and she did not go to a movie theatre until she was 16 years old. Rozema studied philosophy and English literature at Calvin College in Michigan.

Film career
After a brief stint as a print and then television journalist (CBC Television's The Journal), Rozema directed her first feature, I've Heard the Mermaids Singing (1987), a serious comedy starring Sheila McCarthy about a loner named Polly who is an art gallery secretary and aspiring photographer. At the 1987 Cannes Film Festival, I've Heard the Mermaids Singing won the Prix de la Jeunesse. In 1993, the Toronto International Film Festival ranked it ninth in the Top 10 Canadian Films of All Time, with Rozema becoming the first female director to have a film on the list. The film did not appear on the updated 2004 version.

Rozema also directed the Six Gestures (part of the Yo-Yo Ma Inspired by Bach television series), which combined images of Yo-Yo Ma performing with skating sequences by Jane Torvill and Christopher Dean, interwoven with J.S. Bach's first-person narrative. Six Gestures was nominated for a Grammy and won an Emmy Award for Outstanding Classical Music-Dance Program, as well as a Golden Rose, the top television award in Europe. She then directed the romance film When Night Is Falling in 1995 starring Pascale Bussières and Rachael Crawford, and featuring Don McKellar and Tracy Wright.

Rozema's next two feature films were made outside Canada; Mansfield Park (1999) is a revisionist adaptation of Jane Austen's novel of that name. Happy Days (2000), an Irish production, is a film version of Samuel Beckett's humorously despairing play in which a woman lives partially buried in a mound of sand.

She later directed and ghost-wrote Kit Kittredge: An American Girl (2008), which was based on the American Girl book series. The film earned Rozema a Directors Guild of Canada Award nomination for Best Director.

Rozema's television credits include the pilot and two subsequent episodes of the HBO series Tell Me You Love Me (2008), an episode of the HBO series In Treatment (2010), and episodes of the Canadian television sitcom Michael, Tuesdays and Thursdays, which premiered on CBC Television in fall 2011. She most recently worked as a director on the Amazon series Mozart in the Jungle.

Rozema and co-writer Michael Suscy received an Emmy Award nomination (Outstanding Writing for a Miniseries, Movie or a Dramatic Special), a Writers Guild of America Award nomination (Long Form – Original) and a PEN USA Award nomination in Screenplay for the HBO movie Grey Gardens (2009).

Her feature film Into the Forest, starring Elliot Page and Evan Rachel Wood, premiered at the Toronto International Film Festival in September 2015.

Her most recent feature, Mouthpiece (2018), premiering at TIFF, is an adaptation of a two-woman play created and performed by Norah Sadava and Amy Nostbakken, who also star in the film. Sadava and Nostbakken play dual versions of the same female protagonist, who struggles to find her voice while writing her mother's eulogy. A profile of Rozema in the Globe & Mail called it "her most directly political film" and added that "it also may be her most heartfelt and emotionally mature."

In 2017, Rozema founded her own production company, Crucial Things, to co-produce Mouthpiece.

Personal life
Rozema is openly lesbian and has two children with her former partner, film composer Lesley Barber.

Filmography

Awards 
 Second prize at the Chicago International Film Festival for her short Passion: A Letter in 16 mm.
 I've Heard the Mermaids Singing won the Prix de la Jeunesse at Director's Fortnight in Cannes and was nominated for Best Picture – with Rozema garnering nominations Best Director and Best Screenplay – at the 9th Genie Awards in 1988. The film received 17 further awards. It is listed as one of the Best Canadian Films of All Time by the International Film Critics association.
 White Room earned 4 prizes, and 3 Genie nominations.
 When Night Is Falling premiered in competition in the 45th Berlin International Film Festival and went on to win over 30 awards from different countries and at various gay and lesbian film festivals.
 Yo-Yo Ma, Inspired by Bach Rozema's episode "Six Gestures" won a Prime Time Emmy Award and was nominated for a Grammy. (other contributors included Atom Egoyan)

See also 
 List of female film and television directors
 List of lesbian filmmakers
 List of LGBT-related films directed by women

References

External links 

 
 Patricia Rozema  – femfilm.ca: Canadian Women Film Directors Database
 

1958 births
Living people
Canadian agnostics
Canadian film editors
Film producers from Ontario
Canadian women screenwriters
Canadian women film directors
Canadian lesbian writers
LGBT film directors
LGBT producers
Canadian LGBT screenwriters
Canadian women film editors
Canadian people of Dutch descent
Film directors from Ontario
People from Sarnia
Writers from Kingston, Ontario
Calvin University alumni
Emmy Award winners
Canadian women film producers
20th-century Canadian screenwriters
20th-century Canadian women writers
21st-century Canadian screenwriters
21st-century Canadian women writers
Lesbian screenwriters
21st-century Canadian LGBT people
20th-century Canadian LGBT people
Canadian lesbian artists